Kashal may refer to:
 Kashal, Mawal, Pune district, Maharashtra, India
 Kashal, Siahkal, Gilan Province, Iran

See also 
 Kashal-e Azad (disambiguation)